is a passenger railway station located in the city of  Nagareyama, Chiba Prefecture, Japan operated by the private railway operator Ryūtetsu. It is numbered station RN5.

Lines
Heiwadai Station is served by the Nagareyama Line, and is located 5.1 km from the official starting point of the line at Mabashi Station.

Station layout
The station consists of one side platform serving a single bi-directional track.

History

Passenger statistics
In fiscal 2018, the station was used by an average of 2629 passengers daily.

Surrounding area
 Chiba Prefectural Nagareyama Minami High School
 Nagareyama Elementary School

See also
 List of railway stations in Japan

References

External links

 official home page  

Railway stations in Japan opened in 1933
Railway stations in Chiba Prefecture
Nagareyama